Bruce Holland Rogers is an American author of short fiction who also writes under the pseudonym Hanovi Braddock. His stories have won a Pushcart Prize, two Nebula Awards, the Bram Stoker Award, two World Fantasy Awards, the Micro Award, and have been nominated for the Edgar Allan Poe Award and Spain's Premio Ignotus.

The 2001 short film The Other Side, directed by Mary Stuart Masterson, was based on his novelette, "Lifeboat on a Burning Sea".

He is a member of the Wordos writers' group and was a member of the fiction faculty at the MFA program in creative writing of the Northwest Institute of Literary Arts. He has taught fiction writing seminars in Denmark, Greece, Finland, and Portugal. In 2010 he taught at Eötvös Loránd University in Budapest on a Fulbright grant.

Awards
 1996: Nebula Award for Best Novelette for "Lifeboat on a Burning Sea"
 1998: Nebula Award for Best Short Story for "Thirteen Ways to Water"
 1998: Bram Stoker Award for short fiction for "The Dead Boy at Your Window"
 1999: Pushcart Prize for "The Dead Boy at Your Window"
 1999: Oregon Arts Commission Individual Artist Fellowship
 2004: World Fantasy Award for Short Fiction for "Don Ysidro"
 2006: World Fantasy Award for Collection for The Keyhole Opera
 2008: Micro Award for "Reconstruction Work"
 2012: Micro Award for "Divestiture"

Bibliography

Novels
Mind Games (as Victor Appleton) (1992)
Ashes of the Sun (as Hanovi Braddock) (1996)

Collections
Tales and Declarations (poetry chapbook) (1991)
Wind Over Heaven and Other Dark Tales (1997)
Flaming Arrows (2000)
Lifeboat on a Burning Sea: And Other Stories (2001)
Bruce Holland Rogers: Short Stories, Volume 1 (2003)
Thirteen Ways to Water and Other Stories (2004)
The Keyhole Opera (2005)
"String Theory" in Riffing on Strings: Creative Writing Inspired by String Theory (contributor) (2008)

Non-fiction
Word Work: Surviving and Thriving as a Writer (2002)

See also
Flash fiction

References

External links
 
 Bruce Holland Rogers' blog
 
 
 
 Bruce Holland Rogers Author Page at Flash Fiction Online
 Short story: "The Best Part of the Day" (Blue Lake Review, March, 2011)

1958 births
Living people
20th-century American novelists
American male novelists
American fantasy writers
American horror writers
American science fiction writers
Writers of books about writing fiction
Micro Award winners
Nebula Award winners
World Fantasy Award-winning writers
Novelists from Oregon
American male short story writers
Chapbook writers
20th-century American short story writers
20th-century American male writers